Qapanlı is a village in the municipality of Qaraağacı in the Tartar Rayon of Azerbaijan.

References

Populated places in Tartar District